Thomas Davis (15 February 1804 – 11 November 1887) was a Church of England clergyman, author and hymn writer.

Life

Family life
The son of the Rev Richard Francis Davis DD (ca. 1766–1844), by his marriage to Sarah Stable, Davis was born at Worcester, where his father had been rector since 1795. Davis's grandfather was the "Mayor of Worcester, Thomas Davis, Esq."

Thomas Davis was educated at Queen's College, Oxford, graduating Bachelor of Arts in 1832. He proceeded to Master of Arts. In 1833 Davis was ordained a priest and became his father's curate at Worcester, and in 1840 was appointed Vicar of Roundhay, Leeds in Yorkshire. Davis's father died at the age of 78 on Christmas Day, 1844, of "a violent cold".

On 10 December 1839, at Stratford-upon-Avon, Davis married Christiana Maria Hobbes, a daughter of Robert Hobbes, attorney-at-law, and between 1843 and 1851 they had six children, Christiana F., Arthur Sladen, Henry Champney, Mary Sarah, Harriet Albina, and Emily Judith. Davis died on 11 November 1887 at Heslington, Yorkshire, aged 83, while his widow survived him until 1899.

Controversial career
Davis is  recorded in The Westminster Review as "one of the conscientious clergyman of the Church of England" who was "unable to preach the  doctrine of endless suffering". A Philosophical Radical, Davis's controversial views were published in 1866 in his book Endless Sufferings not the Doctrine of Scripture.

Davis's daughter Harriet (1850–1892) married politician Francis Martineau Lupton  (died 1921) of Leeds, and their daughter Olive Christiana Middleton (1881–1936) was the grandmother of Michael Francis Middleton, father of Catherine, Duchess of Cambridge and Pippa Middleton.

Publications
Devotional Verse for a Month, &c. (1855)
Songs for the Suffering (1859)
Endless Sufferings not the Doctrine of Scripture (1866)
Annus Sanctus; or, Aids to Holiness in Verse (1877)

Davis's notable hymns include Sing, ye seraphs in the sky and O Paradise eternal!

Notes

1804 births
1887 deaths
19th-century English Anglican priests
Alumni of The Queen's College, Oxford
Clergy from Worcester, England
Christian hymnwriters